Kalaimamani Shri Guru Madurai R. Muralidharan is an acclaimed dance Guru (teacher), composer, dancer, choreographer, lyricist, playwright and director best known for his large body of modern compositions for Bharatanatyam dancers and his many elaborate dance musical productions. His works explore the complexities of Bharathanatyam theory and rhythms while remaining accessible and appealing to a modern lay audience.

Biography 
The Times of India's special publication Madhura Geetham, about the artistic heritage of Madurai, recognized Shri Muralidaran as one of the stalwarts of Indian classical dance and music. Shri Muralidaran began his training at age 7 under Guru Kalaimamani Chamundeeswari.  He founded Nrithyakshethra Dance Academy in Chennai, India in 1978 and has since trained over 750 dancers as a Dance Guru (teacher).  Shri Muralidaran taught nattuvangam and dance to around 4500 students in India and around the world during the pandemic time. He serves on the advisory board of Alagappa University's online degree course program. In November 2022, the National Institute of Education, Government of Sri Lanka, honored him for his services to Bharatanatyam and have included his composition (Varnam in praise of Tamil Annai) in all their schools nationally.

Shri Muralidaran has received numerous accolades, most notably the Kalaimamani award from the Tamil Nadu state government for 2019.  In addition, Bharath Kalachar has conferred the title of Kala Seva Bharathi upon Shri Muralidaran for his contributions to the field of Indian performing arts, Kartik Fine Awards presented him with the Kartik Award of Excellence in 2021  and Pothy's Parambara Classic Awards named him as Parambara Noothana for his contributions to music composition and dance theatre. Shri Muralidaran has also achieved a number of records certified by Guinness, Asia and India Book of Records, including teaching 359 students an alarippu in Sankeerna Jaathi Dhruva Thalam in 2019, composing 25 varnams in 25 days in 2020 and leading 125 dancers worldwide to present 50 unique jathis on a virtual platform in 2021. He composed, choreographed and taught 698 people a varnam on Tamil Annai (Mother Tamil), setting his third record in the Guinness Book of World Records, an effort which also raised Rs. 10 lakh for the Tamil Nadu Covid Relief Fund. Shri Muraidaran also was given the lifetime achievement award 2022 by Abhai Association of Bharatanatayam Artistes of India. On January 22, 2023, Shri Muralidaran was conferred lifetime achievement award by Niruthia Nithyalaya of Chennai and Natyanjali Academy Association of Malaysia. On February 16, 2023 Muralidaran Sir was given the award Natya Achaarya Choodamani for his contribution to the arts from Puducherry Natyanjali Trust at their 17th year Maha Shivarathiri Festival.https://www.instagram.com/p/Cou1pX_hrkM/

Productions 
Sri Muralidaran has been the creative director in charge of music, choreography, script and effects for several large-scale dance musicals.  His productions, incorporating both dance and drama, are based on both traditional Hindu mythology as well as stories from ancient and contemporary Tamil literature.

In November 2009, he debuted Silapathigaram, a production based on the classic Sangam Tamil epic by Ilango Adigal, and which has since been performed worldwide from the US  to New Zealand.  He is the first person to depict Amarar Kalki's historic thriller Sivakamiyin Sabadam on stage in his 2013 large-scale production lauded by The Hindu as a "zero-error show".  His other large-scale productions include Yagnaseni (based on the story of Draupadi from the Mahabharatha), Avadhara Purushan (based on the Kamba Ramayana), and Yadhava Madhava (based on the story of Krishna).  His production Karna, centered on the generous yet flawed anti-hero of the Mahabharata, which debuted in Chennai in April 2018.

Muralidaran has consistently been involved in helping raise funds for the organization Vision Aid, based in Boston, Massachusetts. His productions in support of Vision-Aid, Krishna (2009), Justice of the Anklet (2010), Slaying of the Demons (2012), The Dancer’s Pledge (2014), The Iconic Avatar (2016), Charmer, Warrior, Guide (2017), Golden Armor, Golden Heart (2018), Invincible Spear (2019), The Seven Selfless Sovereigns (2021), and The Jewel of Justice (2022) were received well by all in the area.

The Seven Selfless Sovereigns saw Muralidaran handling multiple aspects of production. He conceptualized the production, composed the music, wrote the lyrics, choreographed items, created all graphic design elements and visuals, and directed and edited the pieces. Again with The Jewel of Justice, Muralidaran handled all the aspects of production.

In 2022, Muralidaran returned to world tours after being unable to during pandemic. He conducted in person workshops around the USA and also presented some of his theatrical productions. In July 2022, his large scale Tamil Sangam poetry production was presented for FETNA at their convention in New York by high caliber dancers hand-picked by Muralidaran himself. These dancers including his senior disciples, students of teachers that had trained under his guidance, and students who have never met him in person but had been training intensely with him online. His well-known production, Karna, was presented in Texas in September, while the Tamil Sangam production had an encore presentation in Texas. In December 2022, Muralidaran staged his Tamil Sangam production at three major events in India - (1) Bharat Kalachar, (2) Tamil Tourism program, and (3) Karthik Fine Arts Center.

Notable compositions 
Sri Muralidaran has composed and released more than 120 audio albums exclusively for the field of Bharathanatyam. His dance music albums are used by Bharatha Natyam dancers worldwide.  He composes both the music and lyrics for his pieces, which reflect innovations in thalam (rhythm patterns), ragam (melodies) and themes.  In 2001, Sri Muralidaran was recognized by the prominent Indian music and dance critic Subbudu for "ushering in a new era of composing varnams for the Bharatanatyam repertoire with new themes and... encompassing varied rhythmic cycles with matching lyrics."

Rhythmic repertoire 
Having studied mridangam (percussion) in addition to his pursuit of Bharatha Natyam, Shri Muralidharan compositions explore the nuances of rhythm theory.  He plans to have composed full margams (repertoires) in all 35 thalams of the Carnatic Sooladhi Saptha thalam system by 2020, with margams in 20 unique thalams completed to date.

Since 2006, Shri Muralidaran has composed several entire margams (traditional repertoires) in rare thalams, including Ashta Dasa Margam, composed in misra jati ata thalam, Akhanda Margam, composed in kanda jati ata thalam, and Nava Dhruvam, composed in sakeerna jati dhruva thalam, the longest thalam cycle with 29 aksharas.

Kalaimamani Shri Madurai R. Muralidaran has directed a number of dance festivals and record-setting performances.  In 2018, Shri Muralidaran highlighted his exploration of rhythm with a pair of dance festivals. In April 2018, his rhythm festival Chaturvidham presented four new margams each completely set to a rare thalam.  The festival culminated with a massive live class with over 320 students learning the nattuvangam and choreography for an alarippu set to Sankeerna Jaathi Dhruva Thalam, the longest thalam in the Carnatic system.  This class set Guinness, India Book and Asia Book records for the largest live Bharatha Natyam dance lesson. In November 2018, Shri Muralidharan presented Dhimahi, a three-day dance festival described as "dynamic meditations on Laya" (rhythm), featuring new margams set to 5 more rare thalams.  In addition, renown guest artistes Shobana, Lavanya Shankar, Parvathi Ravi Ghantasala, Anitha Guha, Uma Murali, Rukmini Vijayakumar and Srekala Bharath showcased choreography in their own styles for some of Shri Muralidharan's other compositions.

Melodic repertoire 
In addition to composing individual songs in all 35 thalams of the Carnatic Sooladhi Saptha thalam system, Shri Muralidaran has also composed over 120 varnams, and jathswarams in all 72 Melakarata Ragas.  Creating compositions in all 72 ragas is an accomplishment that Shri Muralidharan shares with only one other, M. Balamuralikrishna. He likes to explore rare ragas in his compositions, such as Chandrajyoti, Ganamurthi, and Madhyamavati.  .

Thematic repertoire 
His unique compositions include a dance depicting daily life to the soundtrack of a heartbeat, a varnam on the Sun God (Surya), a shabdam on Jesus, a depiction of Krishna's dance upon the five-headed snake Kalinga, kauthuvams on Mother and Father, a keerthanam on the Indian Independence movement and pieces on women's empowerment.  His compositions are used frequently by Bharatha Natyam dancers of different styles and from diverse regions. He has written a number of new compositions in the kauthuvam style, including ones in praise of the Hindu deities Nandi, Ayyappan and Venkateswara.

Sri Muralidharan's thematic repertoires include Sri Anjeneyam, which centers on the stories of Lord Hanuman and Nayaka, which explores the different roles in life for males from boyhood through adult.

Key Titles 
Amongst his many awards, below are some of the most notable titles garnered by Shri Madurai R. Muralidaran for his excellence in the arts and theater.
 Kalaimamani Award  (2019) - from Tamil Nadu state government
 Kala Seva Bharathi (2018-2019) - from Bharath Kalachar
 Kartik Award of Excellence (2021) - from Kartik Fine Awards
 Mayura Nrithya Sagaram (2022)
 Natya Sadhanai Chemmal (2022) - from Abhai Association of Bharatanatyam Artistes of India
 Kalai Chemmal (2022) - from Sangamam Global Academy
 Lifetime Achievement Award (2022) - frim Abhai Association of Bharatanatayam Artistes of India
 Lifetime Achievement Award (2023) - from Niruthia Nithyalaya of Chennai and Natyanjali Academy Association of Malaysia
 Natya Achaarya Choodamani (2023) - from Puducherry Natyanjali Trust

World Records 
Below is a list of the records held by Shri Madurai R. Muralidaran.

Asia Book of World Records
 April 1, 2018 - "The Largest Bharatanatayam Dance Lesson"
 January 31, 2021 - "Maximum Participants Performing Bharatanatyam jatis (50 jatis) on Virtual Platform"
 May 23, 2021 - "25 Varnams Composed in 25 Days"
 October 10, 2021 - "Bharatanatyam Jathis performed online by dancers for the longest duration"

Guinness Book of World Records
 April 1, 2018 - "The Largest Bharatanatayam Dance Lesson"
 April 18, 2021 - "Most people in an online video relay performing a choreographed dance."
 August 1, 2021 - "Most people performing a choreographed dance online simultaneously"

India Book of World Records
 April 1, 2018 - "The Largest Bharatanatayam Dance Lesson"
 January 31, 2021 - "Maximum Participants Performing Bharatanatyam jatis (50 jatis) on Virtual Platform"
 May 23, 2021 - "25 Varnams Composed in 25 Days"
 October 10, 2021 - "Bharatanatyam Jathis performed online by dancers for the longest duration"

World Records Union
 October 10, 2021 - "Bharatanatyam Jathis performed online by dancers for the longest duration"

References 

Year of birth missing (living people)
Living people
Indian founders
Indian composers